Oka Chinna Maata is a 1997 Indian Telugu-language romance film produced by B. Siva Rama Krishna under the Sri Venkateswara Art Films banner and directed by Muthyala Subbaiah. It stars Jagapathi Babu and Indraja, with music composed by Bharadwaj. The film was recorded as a super hit at the box office. The storyline was inspired by Charana Daasi (1956), which is based on Rabindranath Tagore's 1906 novel Noukadubi.

Plot
The film begins in a colony where diverse communities of various mindsets stay together. Chandu a top-most beautician newly resides as a tenant in the house of its president Abbaigaru. Geeta the distant relative of Abbagaru also joins therein. Soon Chandu loves her and waits for a shot to express it. Chandu’s maternal aunt also wants to knit her daughter Sireesha with him. Besides, Rajeev a psycho behind Geeta and nags her for nuptials. Here, as a flabbergast, it is revealed that Chandu & Geeta are spouses to which they are unbeknownst. Now the story proceeds rearward. Once Chandu visits the marriage of his father Chalapati Rao’s bestie Parandamaiah’s daughter that is Geeta only. Unfortunately, it is called off as aware that the bridegroom is a fraud. During that plight, Chalapathi Rao imposes Chandu to wedlock Geeta to keep them at save face. Due to the sudden and unwilling alliance, the couple overlooks. Afterward, the bridal party travels on the unexpected train journey when the two are in different compartments. However, they sing a song which viva voce binds them. The train runs into a disastrous accident in which, apart from Chandu & Geeta everyone dies and the pair errors the opposite has been passed away.

At present, Chandu proposes to Geeta which she denies through a letter by affirming her past, but it falls short. At that point, Rajeev acquires the marriage album of Chandu & Geeta. So, he prints wedding cards of Chandu & Geeta and throws the ball at Chandu to create a rift. Then, Geeta rebukes Chandu and he quits the house. Moreover, Rajeev rues by morphing the photographs and forges an unknown person as Geeta’s husband. Being incognizant of it, Chandu only mingles Geeta with him. Forthwith, Chandu’s aunt requests him to splice with Sireesha which he disagrees with. But later he allows it when Sireesha attempts suicide. During the time of espousal, Sireesha obtains the letter written by Geeta and breaks out the fact. At the same time, Rajeev plots to abduct Geeta on a train. Immediately, Chandu rushes to the railway station and states the truth that she feels is dubious. At last, Chandu sings their song when Geeta recognizes him and stops the train. Finally, the movie ends on a happy note with the reunion of the twosome.

Cast

Soundtrack

Music composed by Bharadwaj. The music is released on Supreme Music Company.

References

External links
 

1997 films
1990s Telugu-language films
Indian romantic drama films
1997 romantic drama films
Films based on works by Rabindranath Tagore
Films based on Indian novels
Films based on romance novels
Films directed by Muthyala Subbaiah